Clifford Altamirano Laing, nicknamed La Agujita (the Little Needler), (born 20 September 1982) is a Honduran football midfielder or forward.

Club career
Laing started his career at Platense, showing a great performance. In 2004, Real España purchase him. He went on a trial for Danubio in Uruguay, but failed to stay. He had a short spell at C.D. Marathón, before going to Vida, Social Sol, Platense, and Villanueva. He last played for Honduras El Progreso in Liga de Ascenso.

References

1982 births
Living people
Honduran footballers
Real C.D. España players
C.D.S. Vida players
Platense F.C. players
Liga Nacional de Fútbol Profesional de Honduras players
Association football wingers